The Syrian Armed Forces are the military forces of the Syrian Arab Republic. They consist of the Syrian Army, Syrian Air Force, Syrian Navy, Syrian Air Defense Force, and paramilitary forces, such as the National Defence Force. According to the Syrian constitution, the President of Syria is the Commander-in-Chief of the Armed Forces.

The military is a conscripted force; males serve in the military at age 18, but they are exempted from service if they do not have a brother who can take care of their parents. Since the Syrian Civil War, the enlisted members of the Syrian military have dropped by over half from a pre-civil war figure of 325,000 to 150,000 soldiers in the army in December 2014 due to casualties, desertions and draft dodging, reaching between 178,000 and 220,000 soldiers in the army, in addition to 80,000 to 100,000 irregular forces.

Before the start of the Syrian Civil War, the obligatory military service period was being decreased over time. In 2005, it was reduced from two and a half years to two years, in 2008 to 21 months and in 2011 to a year and a half. Since the Syrian Civil War the Syrian government has reportedly engaged in arrest campaigns and enacted new regulations, with citizens who have completed mandatory conscription being called up for reserve duty.

History
The French Mandate volunteer force, which would later become the Syrian army, was established in 1920 with the threat of Syrian−Arab nationalism in mind. Although the unit's officers were originally all French, it was, in effect, the first indigenous modern Syrian army. In 1925 this force was expanded and designated the Special Troops of the Levant (Troupes Spéciales du Levant). In 1941, during World War II, the Army of the Levant participated in a futile resistance to the British and Free French invasion that ousted the Vichy French from Syria during the Syria–Lebanon Campaign. After the Allied takeover, the army came under the control of the Free French and was designated the Levantine Forces (Troupes du Levant). French Mandate authorities maintained a gendarmerie to police Syria's vast rural areas. This paramilitary force was used to combat criminals and political foes of the Mandate government. As with the Levantine Special Troops, French officers held the top posts, but as Syrian independence approached, the ranks below major were gradually filled by Syrian officers who had graduated from the Homs Military Academy, which had been established by the French during the 1930s. In 1938 the Troupes Spéciales numbered around 10,000 men and 306 officers (of whom 88 were French, mainly in the higher ranks). A majority of the Syrian troops were of rural background and minority ethnic origin, mainly Alawis, Druzes, Kurds and Circassians. By the end of 1945 the army numbered about 5,000 and the gendarmerie some 3,500. In April 1946 the last French officers were forced to leave Syria due to sustained resistance offensives; the Levantine Forces then became the regular armed forces of the newly independent state and grew rapidly to about 12,000 by the time of the 1948 Arab−Israeli War, the first of four Arab−Israeli wars involving Syria between 1948 and 1986.

After the Second World War
The Syrian Armed Forces fought in the 1948 Arab–Israeli War (against Israel) and were involved in a number of military coups. Between 1948 and 1967 a series of coups destroyed the stability of the government and any remaining professionalism within the armed forces. In March 1949 the chief of staff, Gen. Husni al-Za'im, installed himself as president. Two more military dictators followed by December 1949. Gen. Adib Shishakli then held power until deposed in the 1954 Syrian coup d'etat. Further coups followed, each attended by a purge of the officer corps to remove supporters of the losers from the force.

In 1963 the Military Committee of the Syrian Regional Command of the Arab Socialist Ba'ath Party spent most of its time planning to take power through a conventional military coup. From the very beginning the Military Committee knew it had to capture al-Kiswah and Qatana—two military camps—seize control of the 70th Armored Brigade at al-Kiswah, the Military Academy in the city of Homs and the Damascus radio station. While the conspirators of the Military Committee were all young, their aim was not out of reach; the sitting regime had been slowly disintegrating and the traditional elite had lost effective political power over the country. A small group of military officers, including Hafez al-Assad, seized control in the March 1963 Syrian coup d'etat. Following the coup, Gen. Amin al-Hafiz discharged many ranking Sunni officers, thereby, Stratfor says, "providing openings for hundreds of Alawites to fill top-tier military positions during the 1963–1965 period on the grounds of being opposed to Arab unity. This measure tipped the balance in favor of Alawite officers who staged a coup in 1966 and for the first time placed Damascus in the hands of the Alawites."

The Armed Forces were involved in the 1967 Six-Day War (against Israel). Since 1967 most of the Golan Heights territory of southwestern Syria has been under Israeli occupation. They then fought in the late 1960s War of Attrition (against Israel) and the 1970 Black September invasion of Jordan. During the Yom Kippur War of 1973 the Syrian Army launched an attack to liberate the occupied Golan Heights that was only narrowly repulsed with the help of the US. Since 1973 the cease-fire line has been respected by both sides, with very few incidents until the Syrian civil war.

Syria was invited into Lebanon by that country's president in 1976, to intervene on the side of the Lebanese government against PLO guerilla and Lebanese Christian forces. The Arab Deterrent Force originally consisted of a Syrian core, up to 25,000 troops, with participation by some other Arab League states totaling only around 5,000 troops. In late 1978, after the Arab League had extended the mandate of the Arab Deterrent Force, the Sudanese, the Saudis and the United Arab Emirates announced intentions to withdraw troops from Lebanon, extending their stay into the early months of 1979 at the Lebanese governments request. The Libyan troops were essentially abandoned and had to find their own way home (if at all), and the ADF thereby became a purely Syrian force (which did include the Palestinian Liberation Army (PLA)). 

A year after Israel invaded and occupied Southern Lebanon during the 1982 Lebanon War, the Lebanese government failed to extend the ADF's mandate, thereby effectively ending its existence, although not the Syrian or Israeli military presence in Lebanon. Eventually the Syrian presence became known as the Syrian occupation of Lebanon.

Occupation of Lebanon
Syrian forces, still technically known as the Arab Deterrent Force, lingered in Lebanon throughout the Lebanese civil war (1975–90). Eventually the Syrians brought most of the nation under their control as part of a power struggle with Israel, which had occupied areas of southern Lebanon in 1978. In 1985, Israel began to withdraw from Lebanon, as a result of domestic opposition in Israel and international pressure. In the aftermath of this withdrawal, the War of the Camps broke out, with Syria fighting their former Palestinian allies. Following the end of the Lebanese civil war in 1990, the Syrian occupation of Lebanon continued until they themselves were also forced out by widespread public protest and international pressure. About 20,000 Syrian soldiers were deployed in Lebanon until 27 April 2005, when the last of Syria's troops left the country. Syrian forces have been accused of involvement in the murder of Rafiq al-Hariri, as well as continued meddling in Lebanese affairs, and an international investigation into the Hariri killing and several subsequent bomb attacks has been launched by the UN.

Other engagements
Engagements since 1979 have included the Muslim Brotherhood insurgency (1979–82), notably including the Hama massacre, the 1982 Lebanon War (against Israel) and the dispatch of the 9th Armored Division to Saudi Arabia in 1990–91, ahead of the Gulf War against Iraq. The 9th Armored Division served as the Arab Joint Forces Command North reserve and saw little action. Syria's force numbered ~20,000 in strength (the sixth-largest contingent) and its involvement was justified domestically as an effort to defend Saudi Arabia. Syria's initial involvement in Operation Desert Shield also rolled into the Allied Operation Desert Storm, as Syrian forces did participate in helping dislodge and drive Iraqi forces out of Kuwait City. Total losses sustained were two dead and one wounded. There were indications the Syrian government had been prepared to double its force to 40,000.

Modernisation

In recent years Syria has relied on Russian arms purchases to obtain modern weapons. Purchases have included anti-tank and air defense systems. In early September 2008 the Syrian government ordered MiG-29SMT fighters, Pantsir S1E air-defence systems, Iskander tactical missile systems, Yak-130 aircraft, and two Amur-1650 submarines from Russia.

Russia aims to turn the Russian naval base in Tartus into a permanent base. Israel and the US oppose further arms sales to Syria due to fears that the weapons could fall under the control of Iran or Hezbollah fighters in Lebanon.

Syrian Civil War 

Because of the violence against the people by the Syrian Army and the detention of a great number of people, some soldiers from different religions and sects (Sunni, Shia, Druze and Christian) defected in protest at orders to kill protesters in April 2011. By 2014, the
number of defecting officers had reached approximately 170,000, from different ranks. They formed the Free Syrian Army on 29 July 2011 (interview with Riad Al-Asaad - the founder and leader of the Free Syrian Army), and at the beginning of the conflict they depended on light
weapons. The arming of the Free Syrian Army began in mid-2012.

In March 2012 the Syrian government issued new travel restrictions for military-aged males. Under the new restrictions, reported by local Syrian news outlets, all males between 18–42 were banned from traveling outside the country. In a late June 2012 interview given by the FSA's Asharq Al-Awsat he claimed Riad al-Asaad said that about 20–30 Syrian officers defected to Turkey each day.

On 18 July 2012 the Syrian Defense Minister Dawoud Rajha, former defense minister Hasan Turkmani and the president's brother-in-law Gen. Assef Shawkat were killed in a bomb attack in Damascus. Syrian intelligence chief Hisham Bekhityar and Head of the 4th Army Division Maher Al Assad—brother of President Assad—were also injured in the explosion.

Since the start of the conflict in Syria, human rights groups say that the majority of abuses have been committed by the Syrian government's forces, and UN investigations have concluded that the government's abuses are the greatest in both gravity and scale. The branches of the Syrian Armed Forces that have committed war crimes include at least the Syrian Arab Army, Syrian Arab Air Force and the Syrian Military Intelligence. However the Syrian authorities deny these accusations and claim that irregular armed groups with foreign support are behind the atrocities, including Al Qaeda linked Insurgents.

The numbers in the Syrian armed forces have reduced considerably during the Civil War, although estimates vary. 

Russian sources give higher estimates. In 2011, 300,000 reserves were reported in addition to regular forces. In 2014, Gazeta.ru reported that the regular army had reduced from 325,000 to 150,000 due to "mortality, desertions and deviations", but that this was supplemented by 60,000 Republican Guards and 50,000 Kurdish militias. In 2015, LifeNews still reported the same figures.

Despite shrinking by nearly half from the 2011 beginning of the civil war by 2014, the Armed Forces have become much more flexible and capable, especially in anti-guerilla warfare. Their modus operandi switched from traditional Soviet-modeled conventional military forces into a force of smaller groups fighting in close-quarters guerrilla combat with an increasing role for junior officers.

In September 2018, Statista Charts estimated that the Syrian military had lost 111 warplanes since the beginning of the civil war, including reconnaissance and attack drones. The Syrians lost most of their warplanes during the first four years of the war, with losses significantly decreasing after the Russian intervention into the war.

Structure
 
With its headquarters in Damascus, the Syrian military consists of air, ground and naval forces. Active personnel were estimated as 295,000 in 2011, with an additional 314,000 reserves. Paramilitary forces were estimated at 108,000 in 2011. Estimates of the declining size of the armed forces over time include141,400 as of June 2019. 

In 2011, the majority of the Syrian military were Sunni, but most of the military leadership were Alawites. Alawites made up 12% of the pre-war Syrian population but 70% of the career soldiers in the Syrian Army. A similar imbalance is seen in the officer corps, where some 80% of the officers are Alawites. The military's most elite divisions, the Republican Guard and the 4th Armored Division, which are commanded by Bashar al-Assad's brother Maher, are exclusively Alawite. Most of Syria's 300,000 conscripts in 2011 were, however, Sunni.

Syrian Army

In 1987 Joshua Sinai of the Library of Congress wrote that the Syrian Arab Army (SAA) was the dominant military service, and as such controlled the senior-most posts in the armed forces and had the most manpower, approximately 80% of the combined services. In 1987 Sinai wrote that the major development in force organization was the establishment of an additional divisional framework based on the special forces and the organization of ground formations into two corps. In 2010 the International Institute for Strategic Studies estimated army regulars at 220,000, with an additional 280,000 reserves. That figure was unchanged in the 2011 edition of the Military Balance, but in the 2013 edition, in the midst of the war, the IISS estimated that army strength was 110,000. By the end of 2017, analysts estimated the SAA to have just 25,000 combat-ready troops. In 2022 the "conventional formations, special forces, and auxiliary militias" of the army totalled a reported 130,000.

The army's formations included three army corps (the 1st, 2nd, and 3rd), eight armored divisions (with one independent armored brigade), three mechanized divisions, one armored-special forces division and ten independent airborne-special forces brigades. The army had 11 divisional formations reported in 2011, with a fall in the number of armored divisions reported from the 2010 edition from eight to seven. The independent armored brigade had been replaced by an independent tank regiment. However, in addition to the 14th Special Forces Division, the 15th Special Forces Division has been identified by Human Rights Watch in 2011.

The former Defense companies were merged into the Syrian Army as the 4th Armored Division and the Republican Guard. The 4th Armored Division became one of the Syrian government's most trusted security forces.

Syrian Air Force

The Syrian Arab Air Force is the aviation branch of the Syrian Armed Forces. It was established in 1948 and saw combat in 1948, 1967, 1973 and in 1982 against Israel. It has seen combat against militant groups on Syrian soil from 2011 to 2012, during the Syrian civil war. Presently there are at least 15 Syrian air force bases throughout the country. In 2011, Russian sources reported 40,000 personnel in the Air Force, while Reuters reported 100,000. In 2022 the Air Force was reportedly estimated at 15,000 strong.

Syrian Navy

In 1950 the Syrian Navy was established following the procurement of a few naval craft from France. The initial personnel consisted of soldiers who had been sent to French academies of naval training. In 1985 the Navy consisted of approximately 4,000 regular and 2,500 reserve officers and men. The navy is under the army's Latakia regional command. The fleet was based in the ports of Latakia, Baniyas, Minat al Bayda and Tartus. Among the 41 vessel fleet were two frigates, 22 missile attack craft (including ten advanced Osa II missile boats), three old submarines, two submarine chasers, four mine warfare vessels, eight gunboats, six patrol craft, four missile corvettes (on order), three landing craft (on order), one torpedo recovery vessel and, as part of its coastal defense system, Sepal shore-based, anti-ship missiles with a range of 300 km. In 2011, the Navy was estimated have 5,000 personnel. In 2022 it was estimated at 4,000.

Syrian Air Defence Force

In 1987, according to the Library of Congress Country Studies, the Air Defence Command, within the Army Command but also composed of Air Force personnel, numbered approximately 60,000. In 1987 units included 20 air defense brigades (with approximately 95 SAM batteries) and two air defense regiments. The Air Defence Command had command access to interceptor aircraft and radar facilities. Air defenses included SA-5 long-range SAM batteries around Damascus and Aleppo, with additional SA-6 and SA-8 mobile SAM units deployed along Syria's side of the Lebanese border and in eastern Lebanon.

At some later point in time, the Air Defence Command was upgraded into a separate Syrian Air Defense Force. In 2022, it was reported as 20,000 strong.

Paramilitary forces
See: List of armed groups in the Syrian Civil War#Syrian government and allies for more information on current paramilitaries due to the ongoing Syrian civil war.
 As-Sa'iqa – a commando force since merged into the National Defence Forces
 Defense Companies – since merged into the Syrian Arab Army as the 4th Armoured division and the Republican Guard as well as the 14th Airborne Division comprising five Special Forces regiments.
 Palestine Liberation Army – a Palestinian Auxiliary, ostensibly returned to Palestine Authority control.
 Republican Guard – since merged into the army.
 Struggle Companies – status unknown.
 National Defence Forces – a part-time volunteer reserve component of the military.
 Local Defence Forces

Role of women in the Armed Forces
As the Syrian Civil War progressed and casualties mounted, more and more positions were opened to women. The National Defense Force allows female volunteers into its ranks, mainly in securing checkpoints. The Republican Guard also formed a female section, an all-female tank battalion of 800 strong, nicknamed "Lionesses of Defense", fighting within the limits of Damascus.

Weapons, uniforms and awards

Weapons 

The breakup of the Soviet Union — long the principal source of training, material, and credit for the Syrian forces – may have slowed Syria's ability to acquire modern military equipment. It has an arsenal of surface-to-surface missiles. In the early 1990s, Scud-C missiles with a 500-kilometer range were procured from North Korea, and Scud-D, with a range of up to 700 kilometers, is allegedly being developed by Syria with the help of North Korea and Iran, according to Eyal Zisser.

Syria received significant financial aid from Persian Gulf Arab states as a result of its participation in the Persian Gulf War, with a sizable portion of these funds earmarked for military spending. In 2005, Russia forgave Syria of three-fourths, or about $9.8 billion, of its $13.4 billion Soviet-era debt. Russia wrote off the debt to renew arms sales with Syria. As of 2011, arms contracts with Russia, Syria's main arms supplier, were worth at least $4 billion. Syria has conducted research and produced weapons of mass destruction.

Uniforms (1987)
In 1987, according to a Library of Congress Country Study on Syria, service uniforms for Syrian military officers generally followed the British Army style, although army combat clothing followed the older British model. Each uniform had two coats: a long one for dress and a short jacket for informal wear. Army officer uniforms were khaki in summer, olive in winter. Certain Army and Air Defense personnel (i.e., commandos and paratroops) may have worn camouflage uniforms. Air force officers had two uniforms for each season: a khaki and a light gray for summer and a dark blue and a light gray in winter. Naval officers wore white in summer and navy blue in winter while lower ranks wear the traditional bell bottoms and white blouse. The uniform for naval chief petty officers was a buttoned jacket, similar to that worn by American chief petty officers. Officers had a variety of headgear, including a service cap, garrison cap, and beret (linen in summer and wool in winter). The color of the beret varied by season and according to the officer's unit.

Syrian Commando and Paratroop uniforms consist of lizard or woodland-patterned camouflage fatigues along with combat boots, helmets and bulletproof vests. Headgear consisted of a red or orange beret. The Syrian military provides NBC uniforms to soldiers to remain effective in an environment affected by biological or chemical agents. This uniform consisted of a Russian-made Model ShMS-41 mask similar to those made in the Desert Storm conflict. Previous models of the ShMS used a hose, while the improved "ShmS-41" used a canister-style Respirator.
It is difficult to assess how well equipped the Syrian Arab Army is. Although hundreds of hours of videos showing dead and captured Syrian soldiers filmed by rebels have been uploaded to social media, none show this equipment having been carried by or issued to frontline soldiers.

Rank insignia (1987)

In 1987, according to a Library of Congress Country Study on Syria, the rank insignia of Syrian commissioned officers were identical for both the army and air force. These were gold on a bright green shoulder board for the army and gold on a bright blue board for the air force. Officer ranks were standard, although the highest is the equivalent of lieutenant general, a rank held in 1986 only by the commander in chief and the minister of defence. Navy officer rank insignia were gold stripes worn on the lower sleeve. The highest-ranking officer in Syria's navy is the equivalent of lieutenant general. Army and air force rank for warrant officers were indicated by gold stars on an olive green shield worn on the upper left arm. Lower noncommissioned ranks were indicated by upright and inverted chevrons worn on the upper left arm.

Awards and decorations
Although some twenty-five orders and medals were authorized, generally only senior officers and warrant officers wear medal ribbons. The following were some important Syrian awards: Order of Umayyads, Medal of Military Honor, the War Medal, Medal for Courage, Yarmuk Medal, Wounded in Action Medal, and Medal of 8 March 1963.

See also
 List of armed groups in the Syrian Civil War
 Human rights violations during the Syrian civil war#Syrian armed and security forces

Notes

References

Further reading
 Armed Forces in the Middle East: Politics and Strategy edited by Barry Rubin and Thomas A. Kearney. London and Portland, OR: Frank Cass, 2002. BESA studies in international security, . ; . Syria chapter by Eyal Zisser.

External links
 Center for Strategic and International Studies, Middle East Military Balance 
 
 Analysis of the syrian army air force and air defence threats in case of no-fly zone
 Key Figures in Asad's Military Command – command structure developments 1976

 
Military units and formations established in 1946
Pro-government factions of the Syrian civil war
1946 establishments in Syria